Veropoulos Skopje (Macedonian: Веропулос Скопје) is a subsidiary of the retail Greek company Veropoulos in North Macedonia stationed is the capital Skopje.

References

Companies of North Macedonia
Companies based in Skopje
Macedonian companies established in 1997
Retail companies established in 1997